H. H. Scott, Inc. was a major manufacturer of hi-fi equipment in the U.S. It was founded in 1947 by Hermon Hosmer Scott in Cambridge, Massachusetts and moved to the nearby town of Maynard in 1957.

History 
H.H. Scott sold some of the earliest FM stereo multiplex tuners and receivers, with some units sold as kits. The company's competition included brands like Fisher, Marantz, McIntosh, and Harman Kardon. The 1961 Model 350 was the first FM stereo multiplex tuner sold in the US. H.H. Scott was involved in early stereo multiplex testing with radio station WCRB in Boston, one of the first three U.S. FM stations to broadcast in multiplex stereo.

The company pioneered developments in noise suppression, tube output circuits, hifi mono and stereo amplifiers, tuners, FM multiplex, transistor receivers, FET RF sections, and integrated circuit IF sections. 

Scott's Instrument Division manufactured precision sound measuring and analysis instrumentation for laboratory use.

"Lacking the capital needed to continue operations, Scott terminated its production in October 1972. In November 1972, several of Scott's creditors filed a petition for involuntary bankruptcy under Chapter X of the Bankruptcy Act, and Scott filed a petition for reorganization under Chapter XI of the Bankruptcy Act. In the same month, Eastern Air Devices released its option to acquire the company. In January 1973, however, the Scott company was acquired by SYMA International, Brussels, Belgium, Scott's European licensee."  "Production at Maynard was resumed in February 1973."  Further refuting the widespread notion that EAD acquired Scott is a letter to the editor of Audio mag, Oct 1975, by Mr. Susskind, EAD pres.

Per NYT obit, Hermon Scott retired in 1972.  Per Audio Eng Society obit, Technical Director Daniel Von Recklinghausen was appointed staff consultant at Electro Audio Dynamics (formerly Eastern Air Devices) in 1973.

Between late 1975 and late 1976, the company's operations moved from Maynard to Woburn, Mass.

In 1985, the brand was purchased by Emerson Electronics.

E.H. Scott

E.H. Scott Radio Laboratories is sometimes confused with H.H. Scott. E.H. Scott was founded in 1925 by Chicago resident Ernest H. Scott. The company motto was "The Fine Things Are Always Made by Hand". The company published news of its latest developments in monthly "The Scott News" from 1929 to 1946. The company was also known as Scott Radio Laboratories, and went through many changes of ownership until its eventual merge with John Meck in the 1950s. Known for its elaborate, high quality radio receivers, the company had no connection to H. H. Scott.  In later years, HH Scott filed a lawsuit ending the use of the Scott Radio Laboratories name.

Gallery

References

External links
 The Vintage H. H. Scott Hi-Fi Stereo Archive
  H. H. Scott - German Scott HiFi Classics and History Site
  H. H. Scott - French Site 
 Focus on HH Scott, Jan 26, 2009 The Absolute Sound magazine by Steven Stone
 Scott Tuners, Feb 17, 2009 The Absolute Sound magazine by Steven Stone
 More Scott Classics, Mar 3, 2009 The Absolute Sound magazine by Steven Stone
 More on HH Scott, June 21, 2009 The Absolute Sound magazine by Steven Stone
 https://web.archive.org/web/20100302185003/http://lacieg2s.ca/w3terra/ols/audion.htm The Audion Circuit Reviews
 Alternate Site for Vintage H.H. Scott HiFi Stereo Archive

Audio equipment manufacturers of the United States
Electronic kit manufacturers
Defunct manufacturing companies based in Massachusetts